José Manuel del Carpio was a Bolivian politician who served as the eighth vice president of Bolivia from 1888 to 1892. A member of the Conservative Party, he served as first vice president alongside second vice president Serapio Reyes Ortiz during the administration of Aniceto Arce.

He was Minister of Public Instruction, Justice and Worship, Government and Foreign Relations in the government of Hilarión Daza. Acting Minister of War during the presidency of Gregorio Pacheco. During the presidency of Aniceto Arce, he also held the position of Minister of Foreign Affairs and Worship.

References 

Conservative Party (Bolivia) politicians
Vice presidents of Bolivia
Foreign ministers of Bolivia
Interior ministers of Bolivia